Dutchtown High School may refer to:

 Dutchtown High School (Louisiana)
 Dutchtown High School (Hampton, Georgia)